Manuel Alejandro Neira Díaz (born 12 October 1977) is a retired Chilean football player who played as a striker.

He played for clubs including Colo-Colo (Chile), UD Las Palmas (Spain), Racing Club (Argentina) and Unión Española (Chile), and scored 2 goals in 13 internationals, including selections for the 1998 FIFA World Cup and the 2001 Copa América.

Club career

Early career
Neira began his career, aged seventeen, at Primera División Chilena club Colo-Colo before moving to the Brazilian club São Paulo FC in 1994, after a notable performance at the 1993 FIFA U-17 World Championships. In the next season, Neira return to Colo-Colo, but in 1996 Neira was loaned to Everton de Viña del Mar of the Primera B in this time.

From 1997 to 1998, Neira was consolidated as player in Colo-Colo, winning the Primera División Chilena title in two consecutive occasions, the 1997 and 1998 season. In December 1998, Colo-Colo sold Neira to the Spanish club UD Las Palmas. However, he was loaned back to Colo-Colo for one season. When Neira returned to the club, he proclaimed champion of the 1999–2000 Segunda División title. Neira was transferred to an Argentine "giant club" Racing Club de Avellaneda for the 2000–01 season. In the Torneo Apertura 2000, Neira only scored 2 goals in 9 games. During the summer of 2001, Neira was transferred to Unión Española, where he made a notable performance scoring 11 goals in 17 games, being one of the top-scorer of the Torneo Apertura. In June 2001, Neira was signed by the Colombian club América de Cali.

Colo-Colo
In January 2002, Neira was once again  transferred to Colo-Colo. He obtained the runner–up title with the club in the Torneo Apertura, after Colo–Colo's 3–0 defeat against Cobreloa in the final. But in the Torneo Clausura of the same year, Neira made one of his most notable season in his career, winning the top–scorer title with 14 goals, and also winning the Primera Division title, after of win to Universidad Católica in the finals.

In the next season, the team lost twice in the same year the final against Cobreloa. However, Neira scored 21 goals in 42 matches over the season. There were many rumors that he would be transferred to Europe, which did not materialize. He played the Torneo Apertura 2004 scoring 1 goal in 16 matches. In June 2004, he was transferred to the Mexican club Chiapas. He remained there for one season in and then  was transferred to Unión Española for second time in his career.

Unión Española
With Unión, Neira won the Torneo Apertura 2005 title, after of the victory against Coquimbo Unido for 2–1. In the next season (2006), Neira scored 19 goals in 29 matches. In December 2006, he was released of Unión and he received many offers for several clubs.

In January 2007, he agreed upon moving to Hapoel Tel Aviv F.C. on a one-year deal with the club until December 2007, refusing an offer from Colo-Colo in this time.

In his second game for the team, in the Channel One Cup, he was injured severely by CSKA Moscow player Elvir Rahimić. Neira suffered two fractures in his ankle, and had to sit out for the rest of the season before he even played a single league game for Hapoel.

For the Torneo Clausura 2007, Neira return to Unión, after of Neira was released of the club. He made his Unión re–debut against Everton at Sausalito Stadium, in a 0–0 draw. He scored his first goal in his third cycle in the club against his former club Colo–Colo, in a 2–2 draw. Finally, Neira scored 9 goals in 19 matches for the tournament.

In December 2007, he tried his luck at the Süper Lig club Gaziantepspor, Neira only trained with them for a couple of weeks, but  was not liked by the coach, and returned to Unión Española.

During  2008, in the Torneo Apertura 2008, he scored 3 goals in 12 matches. In the Torneo de Clausura 2008 he became a key player of the club, scoring 6 goals in 15 matches. However, the club ended up in the relegation/promotion play-offs. Neira helped the team by scoring 2 goals in 2 matches against Deportes Puerto Montt to save them from relegation.

International career
The first international appearance with Chile national football team was in the FIFA U-17 World Championship 1993 celebrated in Japan. In this tournament he was one of top–scorers of the tournament with Peter Anosike and Nwankwo Kanu with 5 goals under Wilson Oruma with 6 goals winning the third place of the tournament.

He participate in the Chile national under-20 football team, he played in the South American Youth Championship in the years 1995 and 1997.

He was selected for the 1998 FIFA World Cup Chilean squad, but did not play. Prior to this, he played for Chile B against England B on February 10, 1998. Chile won by 2-1 and Neira scored the two goals.

International goals
Scores and results list Chile's goal tally first.

Honours

Club
Colo-Colo
 Primera División de Chile (3): 1997 Clausura, 1998, 2002 Clausura

Unión Española
 Primera División de Chile (1): 2005 Apertura

Individual
 Primera División de Chile Top-scorer (1): 2002 Clausura

References

External links

Manuel Neira at PlaymakerStats

1977 births
Living people
Footballers from Santiago
Chilean footballers
Chilean expatriate footballers
Chile international footballers
Chile under-20 international footballers
Chile youth international footballers
1998 FIFA World Cup players
2001 Copa América players
Colo-Colo footballers
São Paulo FC players
Everton de Viña del Mar footballers
UD Las Palmas players
Racing Club de Avellaneda footballers
Unión Española footballers
América de Cali footballers
Chiapas F.C. footballers
FC Spartak Vladikavkaz players
Hapoel Tel Aviv F.C. players
Deportes La Serena footballers
C.D. Universidad Católica del Ecuador footballers
San Luis de Quillota footballers
Santiago Morning footballers
Unión San Felipe footballers
Chilean Primera División players
Campeonato Brasileiro Série A players
Segunda División players
Argentine Primera División players
Categoría Primera A players
Liga MX players
Russian Second League players
Israeli Premier League players
Ecuadorian Serie A players
Primera B de Chile players
Expatriate footballers in Brazil
Expatriate footballers in Spain
Expatriate footballers in Argentina
Expatriate footballers in Colombia
Expatriate footballers in Mexico
Expatriate footballers in Russia
Expatriate footballers in Israel
Expatriate footballers in Ecuador
Chilean expatriate sportspeople in Brazil
Chilean expatriate sportspeople in Spain
Chilean expatriate sportspeople in Argentina
Chilean expatriate sportspeople in Colombia
Chilean expatriate sportspeople in Mexico
Chilean expatriate sportspeople in Russia
Chilean expatriate sportspeople in Israel
Chilean expatriate sportspeople in Ecuador
Association football forwards
People from Santiago